Thomas Solomon (born 1969) is an American magician.

Thomas Solomon may also refer to:

 Thomas Solomon (art dealer) (born 1960), American art dealer and curator
 Thomas Solomon (footballer) in 2013 Torneo di Viareggio 
 Tommy Solomon (1884–1933), last Moriori of unmixed ancestry
 Tommy Solomon (3rd Rock from the Sun)
 Tom Solomon, fictional character in The Five-Year Engagement
 Tom Solomon (neurologist), professor of neurology

See also